Ephraim Zalman Shor (Hebrew: אפרים זלמן שור;  1550 – 2 October 1633) was a 16th-century Czech rabbi who is best known for his rabbinic work on koshrut and the proper ritual slaughter of animals called Tevu'ot Shor.

Biography 
Ephraim Shor was born c. 1550 in Pošná, Kingdom of Bohemia. His father Rabbi Naftali Zvi Hirsch Shor claimed to be a paternal descendant of Joseph ben Isaac Bekhor Shor, and a maternal descendant of Rashi. His mother Rivka Shachna was the daughter of Shalom Shachna. In his early years Ephraim learnt Halakah under the supervision of his father. He married Hanna Wahl Katzenallenbogen who was the daughter of the alleged "1 day King of Poland", Rabbi Saul Wahl Katzenellenbogen. In his mid thirties Ephraim moved to Lublin were he acted as the cities Chief Rabbi. Around 1600 he wrote his magnum opus Tevu'ot Shor which dealt with laws of koshrut and the proper halakahic ritual slaughter of animals. Ephraim died on 2 October 1663 in Lublin, and was buried in Lviv, Ukraine. His descendants would go on to occupy several prominent roles in Eastern European Jewry.

References 

Year of birth uncertain
1633 deaths
16th-century Bohemian rabbis
17th-century Bohemian rabbis